Brackendale is a small community in the Canadian province of British Columbia just north of Squamish town centre, but still within the District of Squamish. It is located near the confluence of the Squamish River and the Cheakamus River. It is intersected primarily by Government Road and Depot Road. The CN railway (formerly BC Rail) traverses it north–south. It includes the remarkable "Eagle Run" area, the wintering home of thousands of bald eagles.

Climate
The climate of Brackendale is dry in the summertime and mild and damp in the winter. The coastal maritime climate is moderated by nearby Howe Sound, but outflow winds from the Interior via the Whistler Valley and the many large icecaps in the Pacific Ranges are so fierce that winds of this type are sometimes known as squamish winds.

History
Brackendale was named for Thomas Hirst Bracken, Brackendale's first postmaster, who also operated a general store and the Bracken Arms Hotel. When the hotel burned down he returned to England and died there. Brackendale is served by two schools in the Sea to Sky School District (#48); Brackendale Elementary School and Don Ross Middle School. It is the location of the Squamish airport (CYSE), with a runway long enough to handle light planes and helicopters.

The Brackendale Art Gallery, owned by artists Thor and Dorte Froslev, is a major cultural institution in the region, featuring local artists and visiting exhibitions. The couple put the aging building up for sale in 2015, but as of yet, no interested parties have stepped forward to purchase it. Some have argued that the building should be purchased by the district and made public.

External links
 Brackendale Art Gallery
Brackendale Eagles Provincial Park
Information about Brackendale BC Area

References

Populated places in the Squamish-Lillooet Regional District
Squamish, British Columbia